Jo-Ann Stores, LLC, more commonly known as Jo-Ann (stylized as JOANN), is an American specialty retailer of crafts and fabrics based in Hudson, Ohio. It operates the retail chains JOANN Fabrics and Crafts and Jo-Ann Etc. The headquarters of the company is located in the former General Motors Terex plant.

History
In 1943, German immigrants Hilda and Berthold Reich, Sigmund and Mathilda Rohrbach, and Justin and Alma Zimmerman opened the Fabric Shop in Cleveland, Ohio. After further expansion, in 1963, the name was changed to Jo-Ann Fabrics. The store's name was created by combining the names of the daughters from both families: Joan and Jacqueline Ann.

In 1969, Jo-Ann Fabrics became a publicly held corporation traded on the American Stock Exchange under the name of Fabri-Centers of America, Inc. In 1994, the company made its first acquisition with the purchase of Cloth World, a 342-store southern company. At the time of the acquisition, Fabri-Centers operated 655 stores.

In 1997, Fabri-Centers settled for $3.3 million on federal charges that it had misled investors in 1992 by overstating its earnings before it sold securities. CEO Alan D. Rosskamm, grandson of Hilda and Berthold Reich, settled a related administrative complaint as well.

In 1998, Fabri-Centers acquired House of Fabrics, which also previously operated as Fabricland, Fabric King, and So-Fro Fabrics. In September 1998, the company changed its name to Jo-Ann Stores Inc., and all of its stores were renamed Jo-Ann Fabrics.

In March 2006, Darrell Webb became chairman and CEO of Jo-Ann Fabrics.

On March 23, 2010, Jo-Ann Stores announced plans to sell out to private equity firm Leonard Green for $1.6 billion and was delisted from the stock exchange in March 2011. In March 2011, Darrell Webb resigned and Travis Smith was promoted to CEO after joining the company in March 2006. In March 2014, Travis Smith announced his resignation and the company's CFO, Jim Kerr, agreed to become CEO until a replacement was found.

In March 2015, Joann stores named Jill Soltau as president, chief executive officer and a member of the company board of directors. Under Soltau's leadership, the retailer opposed President Trump's tariffs citing American manufacturers not being able to meet Jo-Ann's quality or volume needs. She joined seven other retail CEOs at a meeting with the administration where they discussed how the tariff would raise consumer prices and hurt businesses. In March 2018, Jo-Ann Stores rebranded to "Joann" as a way to move beyond fabrics and encompass more craft.

In March 2018, Soltau left Jo-Ann Stores and in March 2019, Wade Miquelon became president, CEO, and a member of the board of directors.

In March 2019, Jo-Ann partnered with GoldieBlox for a monthly subscription box called the GoldieBlox Box to help children ages 8 and up to develop STEM skills.

As of March 2020, Joann has 865 stores in 49 states. Joann is owned by Leonard Green & Partners and was taken off the public stock exchange.

Prior to the COVID-19 pandemic, the chain lost $546.6M in its 2019 fiscal year. However, by the end of the 2020 fiscal year, it made $210.9M to $212.9M and added 9 million new customers. The increase in sales is credited to mask mandates and an increased interest in do-it-yourself projects. In March 2021, Joann made plans to create an e-commerce facility in West Jefferson, Ohio to better serve its online sales.

On March 16, 2021, Joann went public on the Nasdaq market under the ticker symbol “JOAN.” Leonard Green & Partners owns a majority stake in the company allowing it to  nominate up to five directors.

COVID-19 lockdown controversy

During the COVID-19 pandemic, Jo-Ann received public criticism for keeping many of their stores open amidst health concerns for elderly customers and refusing paid sick leave for employees affected by COVID-19. Jo-Ann defended themselves in a statement by claiming that their free mask kits helped local hospitals, which allowed the stores to be considered "essential business," despite many hospitals rejecting homemade masks. Michigan's governor, Gretchen Whitmer, forced stores to close down in the state after Jo-Ann sent a letter requesting to not be included in stay-at-home orders. Whitmer stressed that the same materials used to create masks are able to be sold online without in-person contact. Most of the materials used in the free mask kits were later revealed to be remnants, which are often sold by Jo-Ann at a discount, leading some media outlets to disparage the program as "just scraps from the clearance bin".

References

External links
 Jo-Ann Home Page
 Corporate Profile at Bloomberg News

1943 establishments in Ohio
American companies established in 1943
Arts and crafts retailers
Companies based in Ohio
Companies formerly listed on the New York Stock Exchange
Retail companies established in 1943
Retail companies of the United States
Hudson, Ohio
2011 mergers and acquisitions
2021 initial public offerings
Companies listed on the Nasdaq